The Illustrated War News  with first issue, Volume 1 dated August 1914, was a weekly magazine during the First World War, published by the Illustrated London News and Sketch Ltd. of London, England.

History
At the outbreak of the war, the magazine The Illustrated London News began to publish illustrated reports related entirely to the war and entitled it The Illustrated War News. The magazine comprised 48 pages of articles, photographs, diagrams and maps printed in landscape format. From 1916 it was issued as a 40-page publication in portrait format. It was reputed to have the largest number of artist-correspondents reporting on the progress of the war. It ceased publication in 1918.

References

News magazines published in the United Kingdom
Weekly magazines published in the United Kingdom
Defunct magazines published in the United Kingdom
Magazines published in London
Magazines established in 1914
Magazines disestablished in 1918
Military magazines published in the United Kingdom
World War I publications